San Antonio District is one of sixteen districts of the province Cañete in Peru.

References